The Donalds Grange No. 497, in Donalds, South Carolina, also known as Patrons of Husbandry or Grange Hall, was built in 1935.  It has served as a library, as a city hall, and as a meeting hall. It was listed on the National Register of Historic Places in 1995.

References

Clubhouses on the National Register of Historic Places in South Carolina
Buildings and structures completed in 1935
Buildings and structures in Abbeville County, South Carolina
Grange organizations and buildings
National Register of Historic Places in Abbeville County, South Carolina
Grange buildings on the National Register of Historic Places